Intermuscular septum can refer to:
 medial intermuscular septum of arm
 medial intermuscular septum of thigh
 lateral intermuscular septum of arm
 lateral intermuscular septum of thigh
 anterior intermuscular septum of leg
 posterior intermuscular septum of leg